Enteromius neglectus is a species of ray-finned fish in the genus Enteromius which is found in the River Nile from Egypt to Ethiopia.

References 

 

Enteromius
Taxa named by George Albert Boulenger
Fish described in 1903